Eric Javier Davis Grajales (born 31 March 1991) is a Panamanian professional footballer who plays as a left-back for Fortuna Liga club DAC Dunajská Streda and the Panama national team.

Club career

Árabe Unido
In 2009, he signed for Liga Panameña de Fútbol club Árabe Unido where he made 44 appearances.

Fénix
In mid-2011 he signed a new contract with Uruguayan Primera División club Centro Atlético Fénix. He made his debut on 12 May 2012, playing 10 minutes against Club Sportivo Cerrito.

In summer 2013, Davis joined Sporting San Miguelito and he returned to Árabe Unido in summer 2015.

Dunajská Streda
In September 2015, Davis signed a contract with Fortuna liga club Dunajská Streda.

International career
Davis was part of the Panama U-20 squad that participated in the 2011 CONCACAF U-20 Championship where he help his nation qualify to the 2011 FIFA U-20 World Cup in Colombia.

His senior international debut for Panama came on 11 August 2010 against Venezuela, in a friendly match played in Panama City and he has, as of 8 June 2015, earned a total of 19 caps, scoring no goals.

In 2011, he was called up for the 2011 CONCACAF Gold Cup by Julio Dely Valdés. He played for Panama in the 2015 CONCACAF Gold Cup.

In May 2018 he was named in Panama's preliminary 35 man squad for the 2018 FIFA World Cup in Russia.

Career statistics

International

International goals
Scores and results list Panama's goal tally first.

References

External links

Profile - Sporting SM

1991 births
Living people
Sportspeople from Colón, Panama
Association football defenders
Panamanian footballers
Panama international footballers
C.D. Árabe Unido players
Centro Atlético Fénix players
Sporting San Miguelito players
FC DAC 1904 Dunajská Streda players
Liga Panameña de Fútbol players
Uruguayan Primera División players
Slovak Super Liga players
Panamanian expatriate footballers
Expatriate footballers in Uruguay
Expatriate footballers in Slovakia
Panamanian expatriate sportspeople in Uruguay
Panamanian expatriate sportspeople in Slovakia
2011 Copa Centroamericana players
2011 CONCACAF Gold Cup players
2014 Copa Centroamericana players
2015 CONCACAF Gold Cup players
2017 Copa Centroamericana players
2017 CONCACAF Gold Cup players
2018 FIFA World Cup players
2019 CONCACAF Gold Cup players
2021 CONCACAF Gold Cup players